Psolus is a genus of sea cucumbers in the family Psolidae, marine animals with long bodies, leathery skins and tentacles, that inhabit the sea bed.

Species
The following species are recognised in the genus Psolus:

Psolus agulhasicus Ludwig & Heding, 1935
Psolus antarcticus (Philippi, 1857)
Psolus arnaudi Cherbonnier, 1974
Psolus ascidiiformis Mitsukuri, 1912
Psolus atlantis O'Loughlin in O'Loughlin et al., 2013
Psolus belgicae Hérouard, 1901
Psolus byrdae O'Loughlin & Whitfield, 2010
Psolus capensis Ludwig & Heding, 1935
Psolus carolineae O'Loughlin & Whitfield, 2010
Psolus cherbonnieri Carriol & Féral, 1985
Psolus chitonoides Clark, 1901
Psolus complicatus Deichmann, 1930
Psolus depressus Ludwig & Heding, 1935
Psolus digitatus Ludwig, 1893
Psolus diomedeae Ludwig, 1893
Psolus dubiosus Ludwig & Heding, 1935
Psolus ephippifer Thomson, 1877
Psolus eximius Savel'eva, 1941
Psolus fabricii (Düben & Koren, 1846)
Psolus figulus Ekman, 1925
Psolus fimbriatus Sluiter, 1901
Psolus granulosus Vaney, 1906
Psolus griffithsi Thandar, 2009
Psolus heardi O'Loughlin & Skarbnik-López in O'Loughlin et al., 2015
Psolus hypsinotus Heding, 1942
Psolus imperfectus H.L. Clark, 1923
Psolus japonicus Östergren, 1898
Psolus lawrencei Martinez & Penchaszadeh, 2017
Psolus levis Koehler & Vaney, 1905
Psolus lockhartae O'Loughlin & Whitfield, 2010
Psolus macquariensis Davey & Whitfield, 2013
Psolus macrolepis Fisher, 1907
Psolus mannarensis James, 1984
Psolus megaloplax Pawson, 1968
Psolus membranaceus Koehler & Vaney, 1905
Psolus murrayi Théel, 1886
Psolus nummularis Perrier R., 1899
Psolus operculatus (Pourtalès, 1868)
Psolus paradubiosus Carriol & Féral, 1985
Psolus parantarcticus Mackenzie & Whitfield, 2011
Psolus parvulus Cherbonnier, 1974
Psolus patagonicus Ekman, 1925
Psolus pauper Ludwig, 1893
Psolus pawsoni Miller & Turner, 1986
Psolus peronii Bell, 1883
Psolus phantapus (Strussenfelt, 1765)
Psolus pourtalesi Théel, 1886
Psolus propinquus Sluiter, 1901
Psolus punctatus Ekman, 1925
Psolus rufus Fernández-Rodríguez, Arias, Borrell, Anadón, Massin & Acuña, 2017
Psolus salottii Mackenzie & Whitfield, 2011
Psolus segregatus Perrier, 1905
Psolus solidus Massin, 1987
Psolus springthorpei Mackenzie & Whitfield, 2011
Psolus squamatus (O.F. Müller, 1776)
Psolus steuarti Mackenzie & Whitfield, 2011
Psolus tessellatus Koehler, 1896
Psolus tropicus Cherbonnier, 1966
Psolus tuberculosus Théel, 1886
Psolus victoriae Tommasi, 1971

References

Holothuroidea genera
Dendrochirotida